UFD may refer to:

 Ultra faint dwarf (a type of galaxy)
 Union of the Democratic Forces (France), a defunct French electoral coalition
 United Front Department of the Central Committee of the Workers' Party of Korea 
 Unique factorization domain
 Ural Federal District
 USB flash drive